Political Psychology is a peer-reviewed academic journal published bimonthly by Wiley on behalf of the International Society of Political Psychology. The editors-in-chief are Orla Muldoon of the University of Limerick, Ireland and James Liu of Massey University, New Zealand.

The journal of the International Society of Political Psychology is dedicated to the analysis of the interrelationships between psychological and political processes. International contributors draw on a diverse range of sources, including cognitive psychology, political science, economics, history, international relations, philosophy, political theory, sociology, and social and clinical psychology.

According to the Journal Citation Reports, the journal has a 2019 impact factor of 4.333, ranking it 22nd out of 182 journals in the category "Political Science" and 12th out of 65 journals in the category "Psychology Social". Political Psychology is in over 4,000 institutions worldwide, and in 2018 there were over 600,000 downloads of manuscripts published in the journal.

The journal Political Psychology is housed at the Centre for Social Issues Research at the University of Limerick, Ireland.

Editors-in-Chief: Orla Muldoon and James Liu

Editorial Manager: Cillian McHugh

Co-editors: Pablo De Tezano-Pinto, Sammyh Khan, Robert Klemmensen, I-Ching Lee, James McAuley, and Chris Weber

Associate editors:  Veronica Hopner, Sarah Jay, Alastair Nightingale

Book Review Editor: Kristen Monroe

The new editorial team led by Orla Muldoon and James Liu has been appointed and took up position on February 1, 2020.

Advances in Political Psychology is the second publication of the International Society of Political Psychology. Given the continued growth and explosion of information and interest in political psychology, the society sensed there was an increasing need for a place where cumulative research findings and theoretical developments are synthesized and integrated in a form accessible to scholars, students, and practitioners. The Advances in Political Psychology annual series fills this need by recording the state of the field and highlighting innovative developments so that those who are interested can keep abreast of what is happening in political psychology. Each annual volume includes a selection articles that capture the diversity of subject matter studied by political psychologists. The editors-in-chief are Steve Nicholson Of the University of California, Merced and Efrén Pérez of UCLA.

See also 
List of political science journals
List of psychology journals

References

External links 
 
 http://www.ispp.org/news/journal
 http://www.ispp.org/news/Advances

Wiley-Blackwell academic journals
Bimonthly journals
Publications established in 1980
English-language journals
Psychology journals
Political science journals
Political psychology